West of Eden is a band from Gothenburg, Sweden, that plays folk rock inspired by Celtic music.

The band was formed in 1995 and has released twelve studio albums to date. The founders and main songwriters in the group are Jenny and Martin Schaub. Jenny Schaub is the lead singer and accordionist. Martin Schaub also sings and plays the guitar as well as keyboard instruments. Ola Karlevo has played drums, Bodhrán and percussion since the beginning, Lars Broman plays the fiddle since 2009, and Martin Deubler Holmlund is on the acoustic and electric bass since 2013. Henning Sernhede joined the band in 2016 and plays electric and acoustic guitars, replacing Pär Öjerot.

All albums are in English, with the exception of Taube, released in 2021, which is sung in Swedish. The album contains interpretations of songs written by Evert Taube (1890 – 1976), whom is a legend in Sweden and also hails from Gothenburg. Möte i monsunen contains a guest appearance of Steph Geremia.

West of Eden have toured abroad in countries like Ireland, Germany, Belgium, Netherlands and China.

Discography

Studio albums
West of Eden (1997)
Rollercoaster (2001)
A Stupid Thing to Do (2003) 
Four (2006) 
The West of Eden Travelogue (2009)
Safe Crossing (2012)
Songs from Twisting River (2014)
Look to the West (2016)
Another Celtic Christmas (2016)
Flat Earth Society (2019)
Taube (2021)
Next Stop Christmas (2022)

Live recording
A Celtic Christmas (2009)

Compilation albums
No Time Like The Past (2017)

EP
Cabin Songs (2020)

Singles
Old Miss Partridge (featuring Heidi Talbot & Damien O'Kane), taken from Flat Earth Society (2019)
Silly Old Beggars (2020)
Everywhere, taken from Cabin Songs (2020)
Så skimrande var aldrig havet, taken from Taube (2021)
Så länge skutan kan gå, taken from Taube (2021)

Jenny & Martin Schaub studio album
Kite High (2004)

Martin Schaub studio album
Leaving the Circus (2008)

Martin Schaub EP
Pop City (2021)

References

External links 
 

Swedish folk rock groups
Musical groups from Gothenburg
Musical groups established in 1995